John Gawler may refer to:
 John Cox Gawler, keeper of the Jewel House and British Israelite author
 John Bellenden Ker Gawler, English botanist